Events from the year 1981 in the United Arab Emirates.

Incumbents
President: Zayed bin Sultan Al Nahyan 
Prime Minister: Rashid bin Saeed Al Maktoum

Establishments

 Abu Dhabi Cultural Foundation.

References

 
Years of the 20th century in the United Arab Emirates
United Arab Emirates
United Arab Emirates
1980s in the United Arab Emirates